Right Now Kapow  is an American animated sketch comedy television series produced by Warner Bros. Animation for Disney XD. It is the one of the few collaborations between Warner Bros. and Disney since Who Framed Roger Rabbit. The series premiered on September 19, 2016, and ended on May 31, 2017. The series was created by Justin Becker and Marly Halpern-Graser, who previously worked on the Cartoon Network series Mad. Becker also worked on Adult Swim infomercials, and Halpern-Graser also worked on Cartoon Network's DC Nation. On May 31, 2017, Disney XD canceled the series after one season.

Overview
The series follows six anthropomorphic characters, Ice Cream, Candy, Moon, Plant, Diamond and Dog, are going on new adventures every day as they find themselves in mischief, in a manner similar to the original Looney Tunes shorts. Each episode of the series has three main parts in 11-minute segments, along with other random shorts. The series has a style of humor similar to Cartoon Network's previous series Mad.

Cast

Kyle Kinane as Ice Cream, a yellow male anthropomorphic ice cream cone.
Alana Johnston as Candy, a pink female anthropomorphic bubble gum in a wrapper.
Baron Vaughn as Moon, a light blue male anthropomorphic crescent moon.
Betsy Sodaro as Plant, a green female anthropomorphic palm tree.
Emily Maya Mills as Diamond, a blue female anthropomorphic crystal diamond.
Michael Blaiklock as Dog, an orange male anthropomorphic bulldog.

Episodes

References

External links

2010s American animated television series
2010s American anthology television series
2010s American sketch comedy television series
2016 American television series debuts
2017 American television series endings
American children's animated adventure television series
American children's animated anthology television series
American children's animated comedy television series
American children's animated fantasy television series
American flash animated television series
English-language television shows
Disney XD original programming
Children's sketch comedy
Television series by Warner Bros. Animation